Johannes de Peyster Sr. (born in Haarlem, Holland, about 1600; died in New Amsterdam (now New York City) about 1685) was a Dutch merchant who immigrated to New Netherland some time before 1651.  He was the patriarch of a long line of influential and wealthy family members, who, along with the Van Cortlands, Schuylers, Livingstons, and others, formed New York City’s social and political elite.

Biography
The family name was originally spelled "Peijster," "Peister," or "Pester." De Peyster came of a French Huguenot family that took refuge in the United Provinces about the time of the St. Bartholomew's Day Massacre. He immigrated to New Amsterdam on account of religious persecution. During the brief period in 1673-74 in which the Dutch regained possession of New Netherland, he took a prominent part in the conduct of public affairs, and he was one of the last to take the oath of allegiance to the British Crown on the final cession of the province to that power.

Notwithstanding his tardiness in taking an oath of allegiance, he still remained active in municipal affairs under English rule. At different times, he served as alderman and deputy mayor, but he refused the mayoralty on account of his ignorance of English. At the time of his death, he was one of the wealthiest citizens of the province.

Family
Johannes married Cornelia "Neeltje" Lubberts (aka de Peijster, de Peyster, van Elburch) in 1651 in New York City. Of his sons, Abraham, born when Johannes was 57, became mayor of New York City and Chief Justice of the province; Johannes, born when Johannes, Sr., was 66, also filled the mayor's chair; and Isaac was a member of the provincial legislature.

Johannes senior’s wife Cornelia was the first chamberlain of New York City, besides acting in various other public capacities. His son-in-law David Provost also served as the city's mayor, succeeding his son Johannes.

Descendants 

Filmmaker Ken Burns is a descendant.

References

Bibliography

1600 births
1685 deaths
Dutch merchants
Businesspeople from Haarlem
People of New Netherland
De Peyster, Johannes
De Peyster, Johannes
Johannes Sr.